The following is a list of the heads of government of modern Vietnam since 1945, from the establishment of the Empire of Vietnam to the present day.

Empire of Vietnam (1945)

North Vietnam

Democratic Republic of Vietnam (1945–76)

Status

South Vietnam

Autonomous Republic of Cochinchina (1946–48)

Provisional Central Government of Vietnam (1948–49)

State of Vietnam (1949–55)

Status

Republic of Vietnam (1955–75)

Status

Republic of South Vietnam (1969–76)

Reunified Vietnam

Socialist Republic of Vietnam (1976–present)

Status

See also
History of Vietnam since 1945
Prime Minister of Vietnam
List of prime ministers of Vietnam
Leaders of South Vietnam

Notes

External links
List of Vietnamese heads of state and government
World Statesmen – Vietnam

Vietnam
Vietnam

Heads of government
Heads of government